Macropodiella pellucida is a species of plant in the family Podostemaceae. It is endemic to Cameroon.  Its natural habitats are subtropical or tropical moist lowland forests and rivers. It is threatened by habitat loss.

References

Podostemaceae
Endemic flora of Cameroon
Endangered plants
Taxonomy articles created by Polbot